Andriy Vasylyovych Telesnenko (born 12 April 1966) is a Ukrainian retired footballer.

References

External links 
 
 

1966 births
Living people
Footballers from Odesa
Soviet footballers
Ukrainian footballers
Ukraine international footballers
MFC Mykolaiv players
FC Chornomorets Odesa players
FC Oulu players
Hapoel Be'er Sheva F.C. players
FC SOYUZ-Gazprom Izhevsk players
FC Zimbru Chișinău players
FC Dnister Ovidiopol players
Soviet Top League players
Soviet Second League players
Ukrainian Premier League players
Ukrainian Second League players
Veikkausliiga players
Ykkönen players
Israeli Premier League players
Moldovan Super Liga players
Ukrainian expatriate footballers
Expatriate footballers in Finland
Ukrainian expatriate sportspeople in Finland
Expatriate footballers in Israel
Ukrainian expatriate sportspeople in Israel
Expatriate footballers in Russia
Ukrainian expatriate sportspeople in Russia
Expatriate footballers in Moldova
Ukrainian expatriate sportspeople in Moldova
Association football defenders